Tertiary Highway 805, commonly referred to as Highway 805, is a provincially maintained access road, located within the Nipissing District.

Route description 
Highway805 is a  route located northwest of North Bay which serves as a resource access road. There are no established communities along the highway, but access to Sturgeon River Provincial Park and Obabika Lake Provincial Park is provided from trails that branch off of the route.

The route begins at a junction with the northern terminus of Highway539A next to the Sturgeon River, and travels north from that point. Owing to the rugged terrain of the Canadian Shield, the winding highway crosses between Sudbury District and Nipissing District several times, but generally serves as the boundary between the two. On an average day, only 100vehicles travel along the route.
Highway805, like most other tertiary highways, is not maintained during the winter months.

History 
Highway 805 was designated in 1962, as a northward extension of Highway 539A, which was designated that same year, into Sudbury District. It was initially a completely unpaved road,
and remains that way today.

Major intersections

References 

805
Roads in Nipissing District
Roads in Sudbury District